WVDS is a public radio formatted broadcast radio station licensed to Petersburg, West Virginia, serving the Potomac Highlands of West Virginia and Western Maryland.  WVDS is owned and operated by West Virginia Educational Broadcasting Authority.

References

External links
West Virginia Public Broadcasting Online

NPR member stations
VDS